Thilo Heinzmann (born 1969) is a German painter. After a guest professorship of painting at the Hochschule für bildende Künste Hamburg in Hamburg, he was appointed professor of painting at Universität der Künste in Berlin.

Life 

From 1992 to 1997, Heinzmann studied at the Städelschule in Frankfurt am Main, Germany, under Thomas Bayrle. Between 1993 and 1995 he was an assistant in Martin Kippenberger's studio in Sankt Georgen im Schwarzwald. Between 1997 and 2000 he was a co-founder of various independent exhibition spaces in Berlin, such as Andersen’s Wohnung, Montparnasse, Wandel and Pazifik.

His work is held by Tate Modern in London, and in the Bundeskunstsammlung. The Icelandic composer Jóhann Jóhannsson wrote a string quartet based on "12 Conversations with Thilo Heinzmann", which were held over a period of four years.

References

Further reading 
Thilo Heinzmann, Texts by Michael Bracewell and Philipp Ekardt (German/English), Hatje Cantz 2012.
Thilo Heinzmann by Michael Bracewell Burlington Contemporary 2019

1969 births
German artists
Living people